Ilava is a town in the Trenčín Region, northwestern Slovakia.

Name
The name is of uncertain origin. The historic medieval names were Lewe, Lewa (the same historic name as Levice), Lewa de cidca fluviom Vag, later Ilava. The form Illava is known from the 19th century and was used after the Austro-Hungarian Compromise of 1867.

Geography
It is located in the Ilava Basin near the Váh river at the foothills of Strážovské vrchy mountains, near the cities of Považská Bystrica and Trenčín. In addition to the main settlement, it also has "boroughs" of Iliavka and Klobušice (both since 1969, latter with a Classic castle).

History
The first written reference to the town dates from 1332/1337, the town charter stems from 1339. The settlement developed below a Gothic castle (bearing the same name) from the 13th century, turned into a Renaissance fortification in the 16th century, into a monastery in 1693 and finally, in 1856, into a prison. A concentration camp was in the prison in 1938.

In 1431 was the battle of Ilava between the Hussites and Hungarians.

Demographics
According to the 2001 census, the town had 5,441 inhabitants. 98.1% of inhabitants were Slovaks, 0.9% Czechs and 0.1% Roma and Hungarians. The religious makeup was 87.2% Roman Catholics, 7.9% people with no religious affiliation, and 1.2% Lutherans.

Notable people
 Two-time Stanley Cup Champion and retired Florida Panthers left winger Tomáš Kopecký
 Montreal Canadiens left winger Tomáš Tatar
 Rastislav Blaško, former vice-chairman of Social Democratic Party of Slovakia born in Ilava in 1971, lived in Ladce from 1971 to 1979, in Nová Dubnica from 1979 to 1987  and in Ilava from 1987 to 2001. He is holder of twice bronze medal for 3rd place as the staff member of Slovak FootGolf National Team at the 2. European Team FootGolf Championship EURO FOOTGOLF 2019 in United Kingdom, England and 2021 in Hungary.

Twin towns — sister cities

Ilava is twinned with:
 Győr, Hungary
 Klimkovice, Czech Republic
 Mikołów, Poland

See also
 List of municipalities and towns in Slovakia

References

Genealogical resources

The records for genealogical research are available at the state archive "Statny Archiv in Bratislava, Bytca, Slovakia"

 Roman Catholic church records (births/marriages/deaths): 1673-1913 (parish A)
 Lutheran church records (births/marriages/deaths): 1783-1895 (parish B)

External links

  Official page
Surnames of living people in Ilava

Cities and towns in Slovakia